Natpe Thunai is a 2019 Indian Tamil-language sports film directed by D. Parthiban Desingu in his directorial debut, while Sreekanth Vasrp and Devesh Jeyachandran have written the film's story, screenplay and dialogues. Produced by Sundar C. and Kushboo under the banner Avni Movies, the film stars Adhi, Harish Uthaman, newcomer Anagha and Karu Pazhaniappan alongside actors Sha Ra, Pandiarajan and Kausalya. It is based on the sport of hockey. In 2021, it was remade in Telugu as A1 Express.

This is the second film of Adhi as a lead male actor, after Meesaya Murukku (2017). Apart from acting he also scored the music, while Aravinnd Singh and Fenny Oliver handled the cinematography and editing respectively. The film released on 4 April 2019, to mixed reviews but became a box office success.

Plot 
Prabhakaran is a happy-go-lucky youngster in Pondicherry whose only ambition is to move to France. He goes to Karaikal for this purpose, but there, he ends up falling in love with Deepa, a hockey player. Through her, he comes in contact with Shanmugam, a kindhearted retired military man who is the coach of the local hockey team.

A corporate is after the ground where Shanmugam's players practice, and they are aided by the local politician Harichandran. Later by filing a RTI about the company, Shanmugam learns about the corporation's plan to build a factory in the ground which will pollute the nearby rivers and harm the nearby villagers. Now to save the ground from the corporate and Harichandran, Shanmugam's students should play with the Pondicherry hockey team and win the match. While selecting the hockey players for his team, he learns that Prabha was the 2012 Junior World Cup Indian hockey team captain who was banned for three years. When Shanmugam asks Prabha to join their hockey team and help them win the match, he refuses and narrates his past and his reasons for leaving hockey.

Prabha and Azhar, his childhood friend, are both hockey players. Prabha is an attacker in his team, while Azhar is defense in the same team. Prabha, after being selected by national selectors, joins the Indian hockey team and later becomes the captain of the 2012 Junior World Cup competition's Indian hockey team, but Azhar is rejected in the Indian hockey team and asks about this to his coach, who mocks his desire to play hockey as well as his financial status and instead tells him to help his father in his fishing business. Because of this, Azhar commits suicide in grief, and one of Prabha's friends loses his leg to an oncoming train when he tries to save him. When Prabha learns of this, he gets furious and beats up his coach, because of which he is banned for three years.

Later, Shanmugam decides to protest against the corporate company's unit being set up there with the help of his students and the local people, but Harichandran uses his dirty tricks and prevents Shanmugam from becoming successful in his protest. Harichandran later acquaints with Prabha's former coach to thwart Shanmugam's team from winning the hockey tournament.

After seeing the local people suffering, Prabha decides to join the hockey team and get back the ground. Shanmugam and Prabha train the players, and later, after facing so many difficulties, they win the match and get their ground back. When they come back to the ground, they see Harichandran, who has lost his position now, giving a speech to the press as feeling happy for Shanmugam team's victory. He comes to Prabha and blames the common people for voting leaders monetary benefits and questions Prabha if the people will elect a person who is doing good for them without any money, for which Prabha is unable to find an answer.

Cast 

Fenny Oliver (editor), Sreekanth Vasrp (writer), Devesh Jeyachandran (writer), and D. Parthiban Desingu (director) appeared in cameo appearances as stage singers and performers in Sridhar's sister's marriage function.

Production 
After a successful outing in Meesaya Murukku, director Sundar C. revealed that he is all set to produce another venture that would have Hiphop Tamizha on a film written and directed by debutante Parthiban Desingu which is a film based on hockey. The pooja was held in December 15, and Hiphop Tamizha confirmed the same by sharing a picture with the film's crew.

Release 
The first-look teaser of the film was released on 4 November 2018, which confirmed the title of the film as Natpe Thunai. The film was all set to release on 4 April 2019. Satellite rights Sold to Sun TV premiered on 25 August 2019 in Sun TV (India)

Music 

The soundtrack album was composed by Hiphop Tamizha, with lyrics written by Hiphop Tamizha, Arivu, Sollisai Selvandhar, and Dr. Vadugam Sivakumar. All the songs in the film were released as singles.

Remakes 
The film was remade in Telugu as A1 Express with Sundeep Kishan and Lavanya Tripathi and directed by Dennis Jeevan Kanukolanu.

Critical reception 
Indiatoday wrote "Hip Hop Adhi struggles in film stuffed with social messages" Sreedhar Pillai of Firstpost wrote "A visually appealing, thrilling climax saves this run-of-the-mill sports drama"  Wetalkiess gave Natpe Thunai 3 out of 5 stars and also mentioned this movie is a wholesome entertainment for the youth and as well as the family . Film Companion South wrote ". Despite the choppy editing, the final match has a few mildly rousing moments. As a closing punch, we get a reminder to vote responsibly during elections. ".Sify rated 3 out of 5 stars stating "Sports entertainer".The Times of India rated 3 out of 5 stars stating "Natpe Thunai feels like a blend of plot threads from various films".Behindwoods rated 2.5 out of 5 stars stating "Natpe Thunai is a watchable sports-political drama that could have been more emotionally engaging".The Hindu stated "‘Natpe Thunai’ starring Hip Hop Aadhi packs a punch, especially towards the climax".IndiaGlitz rated 2.25 out of 5 stars stating "Go for this one if you love hockey and enjoy Hip Hop Thamizha music".The Indian Express rated 2 out of 5 stars stating "This Aadhi starrer has all the predictable tropes of a sports film but fails to throw up surprises".The News Minute rated 2 out of 5 stars stating "Sports drama is not new to Tamil cinema but 'Natpe Thunai' spins the package around a new game and a new landscape".Cinema Express rated 1.5 out of 5 stars stating "The film is stuck between trying to be a mindless entertainer and taking itself seriously, with a generous infusion of meme material from our social media timelines".Hindustan Times rated 2 out of 5 stars stating "Natpe Thunai tries to be too many things at the same time -- it is a sports film that is also a friendship drama and has a political sub-plot. In the end, it does justice to none of the genres".

References

External links

2019 films
Indian sports drama films
Films scored by Hiphop Tamizha
2010s Tamil-language films
Tamil films remade in other languages